Jennifer Ann Turner (born 5 September 1969) is a New Zealand former cricketer who played as a right-arm medium bowler. She appeared in 6 Test matches and 30 One Day Internationals for New Zealand between 1988 and 1994. She played domestic cricket for Southern Districts and Canterbury.

References

External links

1969 births
Living people
People from Lincoln, New Zealand
New Zealand women cricketers
New Zealand women Test cricketers
New Zealand women One Day International cricketers
Southern Districts women cricketers
Canterbury Magicians cricketers
Cricketers from Canterbury, New Zealand